Palustriella commutata, commonly known as curled hookmoss, is a plant that also goes by the binomial names Cratoneuron commutatum, Cratoneuron falcatum, Hypnum commutatum, and Hypnum falcatum.

References

Bibliography

Hypnales